Aleksandre "Sandro" Kobakhidze (born 11 February 1987 in Tbilisi) is a professional Georgian football player who plays for Locomotive Tbilisi.

Career
He played for Dnipro Dnipropetrovsk.

International goals

References

External links
 
 zerozero.pt 
 
 

1987 births
Living people
Footballers from Georgia (country)
Georgia (country) international footballers
Georgia (country) under-21 international footballers
Expatriate footballers from Georgia (country)
Expatriate footballers in Ukraine
FC Dinamo Tbilisi players
FC Dnipro players
FC Kryvbas Kryvyi Rih players
FC Arsenal Kyiv players
FC Volyn Lutsk players
Ukrainian Premier League players
TFF First League players
Association football wingers
Expatriate sportspeople from Georgia (country) in Ukraine
FC Vorskla Poltava players
Göztepe S.K. footballers
Expatriate footballers in Turkey
Expatriate sportspeople from Georgia (country) in Turkey
Footballers from Tbilisi
SC Dnipro-1 players
FC Lokomotivi Tbilisi players